Benjamin Seth Smith (born 7 January 1991) is a New Zealand first-class cricketer who plays for Central Districts. In June 2018, he was awarded a contract with Central Districts for the 2018–19 season. On 17 November 2019, in the 2019–20 Ford Trophy, Smith scored his first century in List A cricket.

References

External links
 

1991 births
Living people
New Zealand cricketers
Central Districts cricketers
Cricketers from Hamilton, New Zealand